In places like the United Kingdom, a hip flask defence is a defence to an allegation of drink driving that a driver had consumed alcohol between the time of a vehicular offence, such as an accident, and a breathalyser test, so that a positive result does not actually indicate that they were driving while intoxicated.

Though popular (in 1991, the defence was used in 90% of Swedish appeals against drink driving convictions), the hip flask defence is not always effective. It is possible to back calculate the amount of alcohol and prove an offence nevertheless.

References

External links

Official Motoring Law advice

Driving under the influence
Criminal defenses
Criminal law of the United Kingdom
Alcohol law in the United Kingdom
Alcohol in Sweden